Maršovice is a municipality and village in Jablonec nad Nisou District in the Liberec Region of the Czech Republic. It has about 600 inhabitants.

Administrative parts
The village of Čížkovice 1.díl is an administrative part of Maršovice.

References

Villages in Jablonec nad Nisou District